The 1973–74 West Midlands (Regional) League season was the 74th in the history of the West Midlands (Regional) League, an English association football competition for semi-professional and amateur teams based in the West Midlands county, Shropshire, Herefordshire, Worcestershire and southern Staffordshire.

Premier Division

The Premier Division featured 14 clubs which competed in the division last season, along with three new clubs:
Alvechurch, transferred from the Midland Football Combination
Coventry Amateurs, promoted from Division One
Tividale, promoted from Division One

League table

References

External links

1973–74
W